The Tubariaceae is a family of basidiomycete fungi described by Alfredo Vizzini in 2008.

Taxonomic Details
The genera Flammulaster, Phaeomarasmius, Phaeomyces and Tubaria, that previously belonged to the Inocybaceae, form the family Tubariaceae based on molecular evidence.

References

External links

 
Agaricales families